The North Peace Tribal Council represents five First Nations in northwestern Alberta, Canada. The North Peace Tribal Council was incorporated in 1987, by the Beaver First Nation, Dene Tha' First Nation, Little Red River Cree First Nation, and Tallcree Tribal Government. The Lubicon Lake Nation was accepted into membership in 1995, but left in 2013.

Members
Current Members
As of September 2018, North Peace Tribal Council had the following First Nations with these recorded number of registered members:
 Beaver First Nation: 1,126
 Dene Tha' First Nation: 3,148
 Little Red River Cree Nation: 5,868
 Tallcree Tribal Government: 1,376

Former Members
 Lubicon Lake Indian Nation: transferred to membership to Kee Tas Kee Now Tribal Council in 2013.

References

External links
Official website

First Nations tribal councils
Indigenous organizations in Alberta
First Nations in Alberta